Grant Needham (born 14 July 1970) is a Canadian former international soccer player who played as a striker.

Early and personal life
Needham was born in Liverpool, England, and raised in Montreal, where he started playing soccer at the age of 10.

Club career
Needham played college soccer for Concordia Stingers and at senior level for Montreal Supra, Toronto Blizzard, Montreal Impact, Buffalo Blizzard and Montreal Impact (indoor).

International career
Needham represented Canada at under-20, under-23 and senior levels.

His first senior appearance came in a 0–2 defeat in a March 1991 North American Nations Cup match against the United States in Torrance, California. His second and final game was a 15 August 1993 World Cup qualification match against Australia in Sydney.

Later career
Needham was inducted as a 'builder' by the Montreal Impact in August 2007; he worked for the club as an ambassador and radio commentator.

References

External links
 

1970 births
Living people
American Professional Soccer League players
Footballers from Liverpool
Naturalized citizens of Canada
English emigrants to Canada
Concordia Stingers men's soccer players
Soccer people from Quebec
Anglophone Quebec people
Canadian soccer players
Canada men's youth international soccer players
Canada men's under-23 international soccer players
Canada men's international soccer players
Montreal Supra players
Toronto Blizzard (1986–1993) players
Montreal Impact (1992–2011) players
Canadian Soccer League (1987–1992) players
Major League Soccer broadcasters
Buffalo Blizzard players
Canadian expatriate soccer players
Canadian expatriate sportspeople in the United States
Expatriate soccer players in the United States
Association football forwards